Tradescantia tharpii, the shortstem spiderwort or spider lily, is a species of flowering plant in the family Commelinaceae, native to the central United States. It is small for its genus, reaching only . It is recommended for shady naturalistic settings.

References

tharpii
Endemic flora of the United States
Flora of Kansas
Flora of Oklahoma
Flora of Missouri
Plants described in 1935
Flora without expected TNC conservation status